Covered Wagon Trails  is a 1940 American Western film directed by Raymond K. Johnson, starring Jack Randall, Sally Cairns and Lafe McKee.

Cast
 Jack Randall as Jack Cameron
 Sally Cairns as Carol Bradford
 Lafe McKee as John Bradford
 David Sharpe as Ed Cameron
 Budd Buster as Manny
 Glenn Strange as Fletcher
 Kenne Duncan as Blaine
 George Chesebro as Carter
 Carl Mathews as Nixon
 Jimmy Aubrey as Denton
 Frank Ellis as Allen
 John Elliott as Beaumont
 Tex Terry as Ogden
 Hank Bell as Sheriff

Plot
When Jack Cameron's brother, Ed, is killed on his way to meet his brother who is arriving with a wagon train, Jack sets out to find his murderers.  As part of his plan, he allows himself to be captured by Fletcher and his gang of outlaws. He uncovers that it was Fletcher who killed his brother, in order to plunder the wagon train.  While he is on the murderers' trail, he meets Carol Bradford, the daughter of the wagon train's leader, John Bradford.  The two fall in love. In the end, Jack brings the murderers to justice and Jack ends up with Carol.

Production
In early March 1940 it was announced that Sally Cairns was to be the leading lady in the film.  She joined a cast which already included Jack Randall, in the male leading role, Steve Clark, Glenn Strange, John Elliott, Kenne Duncan, and Dave Sharpe.  Raymond K. Johnson was set to direct under the producing supervision of Harry S. Webb.  Production began in the last week of February, and was scheduled for release on April 10, opening on time.  Production on the film was finished by March 9.  The National Legion of Decency gave the film a rating of A-1, "Unobjectionable for general patronage".

Reception
Showmen's Trade Review gave the picture a positive review, feeling it was well-paced and would hold the interest of the audience throughout the show. They applauded the acting of Randall, as well as the editing of Robert Golden.  The Film Daily gave the film a mediocre review, saying it was simple routine western fare, and the direction and cinematography were simply okay.

References

Bibliography
 Pitts, Michael R. Western Movies: A Guide to 5,105 Feature Films. McFarland, 2012.

External links
 

1940 films
1940 Western (genre) films
American black-and-white films
American Western (genre) films
1940s English-language films
Monogram Pictures films
Films directed by Raymond K. Johnson
1940s American films